Anthony Molina (born 3 August 1990) is a Peruvian retired footballer who played as a centre back.

Club career
Anthony Molina began his senior career with CD Universidad San Martín in the 2008 season. He made his league debut in the Torneo Descentralizado on 25 June 2008 at home against Atlético Minero. Manager Víctor Rivera placed him in the starting line-up along with Orlando Contreras in the centre of defence as the
his side eventually won the match 4–0.

International career
Molina featured for Peru U17 side in the 2007 FIFA U-17 World Cup.

References

External links 

1990 births
Footballers from Lima
Peruvian footballers
Club Deportivo Universidad de San Martín de Porres players
Deportivo Coopsol players
Peruvian Primera División players
Association football central defenders
Living people